Aurelius Opillus was a Roman physician who taught at Rome, first philosophy, then rhetoric,  then grammar. He is placed next in order to Saevius Nicanor by Suetonius.

He gave up his school on the condemnation of Rutilius Rufus in 92 BC. He later accompanied Rufus to Smyrna, where they grew old together as friends.

Works
Another work is named Pinax.

References

1st-century BC Roman physicians
Aurelii